Tenovo is a village in the municipality of Brvenica, North Macedonia.

Demographics
As of the 2021 census, Tenovo had 1,175 residents with the following ethnic composition:
Albanians 963
Macedonians 189
Persons for whom data are taken from administrative sources 23

According to the 2002 census, the village had a total of 1,602 inhabitants. Ethnic groups in the village include:

Albanians – 1,391
Macedonians – 210
Others – 1

References

External links

Villages in Brvenica Municipality
Albanian communities in North Macedonia